A heater core is a radiator-like device used in heating the cabin of a vehicle. Hot coolant from the vehicle's engine is passed through a winding tube of the core, a heat exchanger between coolant and cabin air. Fins attached to the core tubes serve to increase surface area for heat transfer to air that is forced past them by a fan, thereby heating the passenger compartment.

How it works 

The internal combustion engine in most cars and trucks is cooled by a water and antifreeze mixture that is circulated through the engine and radiator by a water pump to enable the radiator to give off engine heat to the atmosphere. Some of that coolant can be diverted through the heater core to give some engine heat to the cabin, or adjust the temperature of the conditioned air.

A heater core is a small radiator located under the dashboard of the vehicle, and it consists of conductive aluminium or brass tubing with cooling fins to increase surface area. Hot coolant passing through the heater core gives off heat before returning to the engine cooling circuit.

The squirrel cage fan of the vehicle's ventilation system forces air through the heater core to transfer heat from the coolant to the cabin air, which is directed into the vehicle through vents at various points.

Control
Once the engine has warmed up, the coolant is kept at a more or less constant temperature by the thermostat. The temperature of the air entering the vehicle's interior can be controlled by using a valve limiting the amount of coolant that goes through the heater core. Another method is blocking off the heater core with a door, directing part (or all) of the incoming air around the heater core completely, so it does not get heated (or re-heated if the air conditioning compressor is active). Some cars use a combination of these systems.

Simpler systems allow the driver to control the valve or door directly (usually by means of a rotary knob, or a lever). More complicated systems use a combination of electromechanical actuators and thermistors to control the valve or doors to deliver air at a precise temperature value selected by the user.

Cars with dual climate function (allowing driver and passenger to each set a different temperature) may use a heater core split in two, where different amounts of coolant flow through the heater core on either side to obtain the desired heating.

Air conditioning

In a car equipped with air conditioning, outside air, or cabin air if the recirculation flap has been set to close the external air passages, is first forced, often after being filtered by a cabin air filter, through the air conditioner's evaporator coil.  This can be thought of as a heater core filled with very cold liquid that is undergoing a phase change to gas (the evaporation), a process which cools rather than heats the incoming air. In order to obtain the desired temperature incoming air may first be cooled by the air conditioning and then heated again by the heater core. In a vehicle fitted with manual controls for the heater and air conditioning compressor, using both systems together will dehumidify the air in the cabin, as the evaporator coil removes moisture from the air due to condensation. This can result in increased air comfort levels inside the vehicle. Automatic temperature control systems can take the best course of action in regulating the compressor operation, amount of reheating and blower speed depending upon the external air temperature, the internal one and the cabin air temperature value or a rapid defrost effect requested by the user.

Engine cooling function 
Because the heater core cools the heated coolant from the engine by transferring its heat to the cabin air, it can also act as an auxiliary radiator for the engine. If the radiator is working improperly, the operator may turn the heat on (together with the cabin blower fan placed on full speed, and with the windows opened) in the passenger cabin, resulting in a certain cooling effect on the overheated engine coolant.  This idea only works to a certain degree, as the heater core is not large enough nor does it have enough cold air going through it to cool large amounts of coolant significantly.

Possible problems 

The heater core is made up of small piping that has numerous bends.  Clogging of the piping may occur if the coolant system is not flushed or if the coolant is not changed regularly. If clogging occurs the heater core will not work properly. If coolant flow is restricted, heating capacity will be reduced or even lost altogether if the heater core becomes blocked. Control valves may also clog or get stuck. Where a blend door is used instead of a control valve as a method of controlling the air's heating amount, the door itself or its control mechanism can become stuck due to thermal expansion. If the climate control unit is automatic, actuators can also fail.

Another possible problem is a leak in one of the connections to the heater core. This may first be noticeable by smell (ethylene glycol is widely used as coolant and has a sweet smell); it may also cause (somewhat greasy) fogging of the windshield above the windshield heater vent. Glycol may also leak directly into the car, causing wet upholstery or carpeting.

Electrolysis can cause excessive corrosion leading to the heater core rupturing. Coolant will spray directly into the passenger compartment followed with white coloured smoke, a significant driving hazard.

Because the heater core is usually located under the dashboard inside of the vehicle and is enclosed in the ventilation system's ducting, servicing it often requires disassembling a large part of the dashboard, which can be labour-intensive and therefore expensive.

Since the heater core relies on the coolant's heat to warm the cabin air up, it will not begin working until the engine's coolant warms up enough. This problem can be resolved by equipping the vehicle with an auxiliary heating system, which can either use electricity or burn the vehicle's fuel in order to rapidly bring the engine's coolant to operating temperatures.

Air cooled engines 
Engines that do not have a water cooling system cannot heat the cabin via a heater core; one alternative is to guide air around the (very hot) engine exhaust manifold and then into the vehicle's interior. Temperature control is achieved by mixing with unheated outside air. Air-cooled Volkswagen engines use this method. Another example is the air-cooled Briggs & Stratton Vanguard, used in the ultra and microlight flight amateur construction scene. This method for cockpit heating is a simple option for the Spacek SD-1 Minisport and other homebuilt sportplanes. However, depending on the design, this can cause a safety issue where a leak in the exhaust system will begin to fill the passenger cabin with deadly fumes.

Reuse for other purposes
Car heat cores are also used for Do-It-Yourself projects, such as for cooling homemade liquid cooling systems for computers.

See also 
 Air cooling
 Internal combustion engine cooling
 Radiator (engine cooling)
 Radiator (heating)
 Water cooling

References

External links 

 entire cooling system

Automotive technologies
Cooling technology
Engine cooling systems
Heating, ventilation, and air conditioning
Heat exchangers